LNH Division 2, doing business as Proligue, is a professional handball league, and the second level of the French men's handball pyramid. It is organized by the Ligue Nationale de Handball, under delegation from the French Handball Federation. Founded in 1952, it is currently contested by 14 teams.
It was administered by the French federation until 2016, when the LNH took over and rebranded it as Proligue to match the name of its top tier, the Starligue.

Current season

2022–23 Teams

See also

 Coupe de France
 LNH Division 1 (Liqui Moly Starligue), upper echelon of French men's handball
 LFH Division 1 Féminine (Ligue Butagaz Énergie)
 LFH Division 2 Féminine (D2F), the corresponding women's competition
 List of handball clubs in France

References

External links 
Official site

1
Professional sports leagues in France